Vera Ann Farmiga (born August 6, 1973) is an American actress who is best known for portraying paranormal investigator Lorraine Warren in the Conjuring Universe films The Conjuring (2013), The Conjuring 2 (2016), Annabelle Comes Home (2019) and The Conjuring: The Devil Made Me Do It (2021).

Farmiga began her professional acting career on stage in the original Broadway production of Taking Sides (1996). She made her television debut in the Fox fantasy adventure series Roar (1997), and her feature film debut in the drama-thriller Return to Paradise (1998). Farmiga's breakthrough came in 2004 with her starring role as a drug addict in the drama Down to the Bone. She received further praise for the drama film Nothing But the Truth (2008), and won critical acclaim for starring in the 2009 comedy-drama Up in the Air, for which she was nominated for the Academy Award for Best Supporting Actress.

Farmiga made her directorial debut in 2011 with the acclaimed drama film Higher Ground, in which she also had a leading role. She also had starring roles in the political thriller The Manchurian Candidate (2004), the crime drama The Departed (2006), the historical drama The Boy in the Striped Pyjamas (2008), the science fiction thriller Source Code (2011), the action thriller Safe House (2012), the legal drama The Judge (2014), the biographical drama The Front Runner (2018), the monster film Godzilla: King of the Monsters (2019), and the Marvel Cinematic Universe series Hawkeye (2021).

From 2013 to 2017, Farmiga starred as Norma Louise Bates in the A&E drama series Bates Motel, which earned her a Primetime Emmy Award nomination. In 2019, she starred in the drama miniseries When They See Us as Elizabeth Lederer, for which she was nominated for a second Primetime Emmy Award.

Early life
Farmiga was born on August 6, 1973, in Clifton, New Jersey. Her parents are Ukrainians: Michael Farmiga, a systems analyst-turned-landscaper, and his wife Lubomyra "Luba" (née Spas), a schoolteacher. She has an older brother, Victor, and five younger siblings: Stephan, Nadia, Alexander, Laryssa (who was born with spina bifida), and Taissa. Her maternal grandparents, Nadia (née Pletenciw; 19252014) and Theodor Spas (19211990), met at a displaced persons camp in Karlsfeld during World War II. As a child, Farmiga converted with her family from the Ukrainian Greek Catholic Church to Pentecostalism.

Farmiga considers herself to be "100% Ukrainian American". She was raised in an insular Ukrainian American community in Irvington, New Jersey, with Ukrainian as her native language. She did not learn English until she started kindergarten at age six. When she was 12, the family moved from Irvington to Whitehouse Station, New Jersey. She attended St. John the Baptist Ukrainian Catholic School in Newark, New Jersey, and toured with a Ukrainian folk-dancing ensemble, Syzokryli, during her teen years. In addition to being a semi-professional folk dancer, she is also a classically trained pianist. Farmiga was a member of Plast.

In 1991, she graduated from Hunterdon Central Regional High School. During her junior year there, she found acting after being benched during a varsity soccer game; her friend convinced her to audition for the school production of The Vampire, and she won the lead role of Lady Margaret. Farmiga went on to study Theatre at Syracuse University, and graduated with a Bachelor of Fine Arts in 1995. In her final year at Syracuse, she portrayed Nina Zarechnaya in The Seagull at the Kennedy Center American College Theater Festival, and the production won the top prize. Her drama professor, Gerardine Clark, stated: "We'd never have won had she not nailed the fourth act. A number of the judges told me that."

Career

Early roles
In February 1996, Farmiga starred as Miranda in the American Conservatory Theater's production of The Tempest. That same year, she portrayed Anne Hartman in a production of Good at The Barrow Group. Farmiga made her Broadway debut alongside Ed Harris and Daniel Massey in October 1996, understudying the role of Emmi Straube in Ronald Harwood's play Taking Sides. Following these stage roles, she co-starred in the Hallmark Hall of Fame western television film Rose Hill in April 1997, portraying Emily Elliot.

Farmiga had a main role in Fox's short-lived fantasy adventure series Roar (1997), alongside Heath Ledger and Sebastian Roché. The following year, she guest-starred in an episode of NBC's procedural drama series Law & Order, portraying Lindsay Carson, the daughter of a convicted murderer who goes on her own killingspree. She next played a supporting role alongside Vince Vaughn and Joaquin Phoenix in the drama-thriller Return to Paradise (1998). She then had a guest appearance on the NBC sitcom Trinity, portraying Allison. Two years later, Farmiga had a supporting role as Lisa Tyler in the romantic drama Autumn in New York (2000).

2000s 
Her next film was the crime drama The Opportunists (2000), in which she co-starred as Miriam Kelly, the daughter of Christopher Walken's character. The following year, Farmiga had a supporting role as Daphne Handlova in the action thriller 15 Minutes alongside Robert De Niro, and co-starred in the drama film Dust, which premiered at the 2001 Venice Film Festival. Farmiga subsequently joined the main cast of NBC's short-lived procedural drama series UC: Undercover as Alex Cross. The series premiered in September 2001, and was cancelled after one season. She then appeared in the Hallmark fantasy television film Snow White: The Fairest of Them All.

Farmiga had her first starring role in the romantic drama Love in the Time of Money, which premiered at the 2002 Sundance Film Festival. In June 2002, she starred in David Eldridge's Under the Blue Sky at the Williamstown Theatre Festival. Farmiga next appeared as Lorena Fanchetti in the comedy-drama Dummy (2003), alongside Adrien Brody.

The following year, Farmiga had her breakthrough role as a drug-addicted mother, Irene Morrison, in the independent drama film Down to the Bone, which premiered at Sundance in January 2004. Praising her performance, Peter Travers of Rolling Stone wrote: "If there were an ounce of taste left in Hollywood, the magnificent Vera Farmiga would be a front-runner for the Best Actress Oscar". She won the Los Angeles Film Critics Association Award for Best Actress, and earned a nomination for the Independent Spirit Award for Best Female Lead.

Farmiga next appeared alongside Hilary Swank and Anjelica Huston in the HBO drama film Iron Jawed Angels (2004), as the Polish-American suffragette Ruza Wenclawska. Soon after, she had a supporting role in the 2004 film Mind The Gap, in which she portrayed a woman who left her fiancé at the altar. She then starred as Detective Susan Branca in the short-lived USA Network adaptation of the British crime drama series Touching Evil.

Also in 2004, she had a supporting role as Jocelyne Jordan in the political thriller The Manchurian Candidate, which also starred Denzel Washington and Meryl Streep. The following year, she co-starred in the fantasy drama Neverwas with Aaron Eckhart and Ian McKellen, which premiered at the 2005 Toronto International Film Festival. Farmiga then appeared alongside Leonardo DiCaprio and Matt Damon as police psychiatrist Dr. Madolyn Madden in Martin Scorsese's crime drama The Departed (2006). For her performance as Madolyn, Farmiga was nominated for the Empire Award for Best Newcomer, and shared with her co-stars the nomination for the Screen Actors Guild Award for Outstanding Performance by a Cast in a Motion Picture. Soon after, she portrayed Dr. Charlie Brooks in the 2006 indie thriller, The Hard Easy.

She next starred as Teresa Gazelle in Wayne Kramer's crime thriller Running Scared, and as the Romanian prostitute Oana in Anthony Minghella's romantic crime drama Breaking and Entering (both in 2006). Farmiga subsequently landed the lead role of Sophie Lee in Gina Kim's romantic drama Never Forever, which premiered at the 2007 Sundance. G. Allen Johnson of the San Francisco Chronicle praised her as "the best American actress you've never heard of". She next starred as Abby Cairn in the psychological thriller film Joshua (2007), with Sam Rockwell, and portrayed Fiona Ankany in the drama film Quid Pro Quo, which premiered at the 2008 Sundance. David Edelstein of New York magazine stated that Farmiga's performance on the latter film was "scarily good", and added: "She's always visibly calculating, thinking better of something reckless she's about to dothen doing it anyway".

In September 2008, the historical drama The Boy in the Striped Pyjamas, in which she portrayed Elsa Hoess, was released worldwide. Farmiga won the British Independent Film Award for Best Actress for her performance. That same year, she starred in the war drama film In Transit alongside John Malkovich, and portrayed Central Intelligence Agency operative Erica Van Doren in the political thriller Nothing But the Truth. The latter role earned Farmiga a nomination for the Critics' Choice Movie Award for Best Supporting Actress.

In 2009, Farmiga portrayed the lead role of Kate Coleman in Jaume Collet-Serra's psychological thriller Orphan. The film was co-produced by Leonardo DiCaprio, who had starred with Farmiga in The Departed. Her performance was praised, with Toby Young of The Times writing that she "becomes more convincing as the story unfolds. By the end, she has you in the palm of her hand". She then appeared as Aurora de Valday in Niki Caro's romantic drama The Vintner's Luck, which premiered at the 2009 Toronto International Film Festival.

Also in 2009, she co-starred as frequent flyer Alex Goran, opposite George Clooney, in Jason Reitman's comedy-drama Up in the Air. Roger Ebert of the Chicago Sun-Times praised Farmiga's performance, stating that she "is one of the warmest and most attractive women in the movies, or at least she plays one". She received nominations for the Academy Award for Best Supporting Actress, Screen Actors Guild Award for Outstanding Performance by a Female Actor in a Supporting Role, BAFTA Award for Best Actress in a Supporting Role, Golden Globe Award for Best Supporting Actress, and her second nomination for the Critics' Choice Movie Award for Best Supporting Actress. On June 25, 2010, she was inducted into the Academy of Motion Picture Arts and Sciences.

2010s
Farmiga then starred in the surrealist romantic comedy Henry's Crime as stage actress Julie Ivanova, which premiered at the 2010 Toronto International Film Festival. She next played Capt. Colleen Goodwin in Duncan Jones' science fiction thriller film Source Code, which premiered at the 2011 South by Southwest.  In 2010, Farmiga was offered a lead role in Marc Forster's action biopic Machine Gun Preacher, but declined because she was pregnant.

During her second pregnancy, Farmiga made her directorial debut with the micro-budget, Christian-themed drama Higher Ground, in which she starred as the protagonist, Corinne Walker. The film received "generally favorable reviews" on review aggregator site Metacritic and premiered at the 2011 Sundance. Many of her family members were involved in the production: Farmiga's sister Taissa portrayed Corinne as a teenager, her husband Renn Hawkey served as a producer and musical director, and her cousin Adriana Farmiga served as an art curator. She received nominations in both acting and directing for the film, including the Gotham Independent Film Award for Breakthrough Director, and the Satellite Award for Best Actress – Motion Picture. In his film review, critic Kirk Honeycutt of The Hollywood Reporter noted: "Directing debuts by actors don't come any better than this". Of her performance, Leonard Maltin of IndieWire remarked that Farmiga "gives an honest, empathetic performance should come as no surprise; she is one of the most gifted and daring actresses of our time".

Her next role was the flaky New Age mother Wendy Whitman in the independent comedy-drama Goats, which opened at the 2012 Sundance. That same year, she portrayed CIA operative Catherine Linklater in Daniel Espinosa's action thriller Safe House (2012). Farmiga starred opposite Ryan Reynolds and, for the second time, Denzel Washington.

Farmiga's return to television came in 2013, when she began portraying Norma Louise Bates, the mother of Norman Bates, in A&E's drama-thriller series Bates Motel. The series is a contemporary reboot of Alfred Hitchcock's classic horror film Psycho (1960). For her performance, she won the 2013 Saturn Award for Best Actress on Television, and the 2016 People's Choice Award for Favorite Cable TV Actress. She also received three nominations for the Critics' Choice Television Award for Best Actress in a Drama Series (20132015), as well as nominations for the 2013 Satellite Award for Best Actress – Television Series Drama, the 2013 Primetime Emmy Award for Outstanding Lead Actress in a Drama Series, and the 2013 TCA Award for Individual Achievement in Drama. Tim Goodman of The Hollywood Reporter called Farmiga's performance "superb" and Mary McNamara of the Los Angeles Times identified her as "the main reason [the series] is surprisingly good". In addition to starring, she served as a producer and later executive producer from the second season to its fifth and final season, which aired in 2017.

She next appeared in James Wan's horror film The Conjuring (2013), which was met with critical and commercial success. The film became the second highest-grossing horror film of all time up to that date. Farmiga portrayed paranormal investigator and self-professed clairvoyant Lorraine Warren, alongside Patrick Wilson, for which she was nominated for the MTV Movie Award for Best Scared-As-Shit Performance. Sheri Linden of The Hollywood Reporter wrote that "Farmiga resonates an extraordinary sensitivity" in the role, while Justin Chang of Variety called her performance "moving" and highlighted her chemistry with Wilson as a "rock-solid rapport".

She reprised her role in the sequel, The Conjuring 2 (2016), which was also directed by Wan. The film was the second released in the main series, but the third released within The Conjuring Universe. Like its predecessor, The Conjuring 2 was met with a positive critical reception and commercial success, surpassing The Conjuring as the second highest-grossing horror film of all time.

Farmiga appeared as Edith Martin in the romantic comedy At Middleton, with Andy García and her sister Taissa. The film premiered at the Seattle International Film Festival in May 2013. Also in 2013, she starred as Alice Bercovich in Nae Caranfil's Romanian-American comedy-drama Closer to the Moon, based on the events of the Ioanid Gang. Farmiga next co-starred in David Dobkin's drama film The Judge (2014) as Samantha Powell, the love interest and high school girlfriend of Robert Downey Jr.'s character.

She then starred as Eleanor Finch in Ricky Gervais' comedy Special Correspondents, which premiered at the 2016 Tribeca Film Festival. She next appeared as Alise Firth in Jordan Roberts' adventure comedy-drama Burn Your Maps, which premiered at the 2016 Toronto International Film Festival. Farmiga co-starred as Dr. Nora Phillips in Neill Blomkamp's BMW short film The Escape (2016), alongside Dakota Fanning and Clive Owen. The following year, she executive produced the documentary film Unspoken, which premiered at the Mill Valley Film Festival in October 2017.

Farmiga co-starred with Liam Neeson in Jaume Collet-Serra's action thriller The Commuter, which was released in January 2018. Also in January 2018, she appeared as a politician in Amazon's sci-fi anthology series Philip K. Dick's Electric Dreams, in an episode directed by Dee Rees. Farmiga then portrayed Laura Jaconi in Shana Feste's comedy-drama film Boundaries, which premiered in March 2018 at South by Southwest.

Next in 2018, Farmiga starred as neo-Nazi group leader Shareen Krager in Guy Nattiv's racial drama Skin, which premiered at the Toronto International Film Festival in September, and portrayed Oletha "Lee" Hart in Jason Reitman's Gary Hart biopic The Front Runner, opposite Hugh Jackman, which was released in November 2018.

In March 2019, she starred as Jane Doe alongside John Goodman in Rupert Wyatt's science fiction thriller Captive State. In May 2019, she portrayed Dr. Emma Russell in the third installment of the MonsterVerse film franchise, Godzilla: King of the Monsters, directed by Michael Dougherty. Also in May 2019, Farmiga portrayed prosecutor Elizabeth Lederer in Ava DuVernay's Netflix crime drama miniseries When They See Us, based on the Central Park jogger case. For her performance, she was nominated for the Primetime Emmy Award for Outstanding Supporting Actress in a Limited Series or Movie. In June 2019, she reprised her role as Lorraine Warren in the horror sequel film Annabelle Comes Home.

2020s
Farmiga appeared in Ryan Murphy's drama limited series Halston, based on the life of the fashion designer of the same name, opposite Ewan McGregor in the title role. She reprised her role as Lorraine Warren in The Conjuring: The Devil Made Me Do It, released in June 2021. In September 2021, Farmiga appeared as Livia Soprano in the film prequel to The Sopranos, titled The Many Saints of Newark, which is directed by Alan Taylor. Farmiga appeared as Eleanor Bishop in the Marvel Cinematic Universe superhero miniseries Hawkeye, which premiered on Disney+ on November 24, 2021.

In 2021, she began starring in the lead role of Dr. Anna Pou in the critically acclaimed Apple TV+ miniseries Five Days at Memorial,  an adaptation of the book of the same name by Sheri Fink. Among Farmiga's projects in development are the horror film Bad Bloom, which she will headline and also produce alongside her husband, and the mystery thriller film The Salamander Lives Twice co-starring Adrien Brody.

Personal life

Farmiga met actor Sebastian Roché while starring together in the fantasy adventure television series Roar; they eloped to the Bahamas after it ended in 1997, and were divorced in 2004. She began dating Deadsy musician Renn Hawkey, after being introduced by mutual friend Allen Hughes on the set of Touching Evil. They married on September 13, 2008, when Farmiga was five months pregnant with their first child. She gave birth to a son, Fynn, in January 2009 in Rhinebeck, New York and a daughter, Gytta, in November 2010. The family owns homes in Hudson Valley, New York and Vancouver, British Columbia, Canada.

Farmiga's sister-in-law is actress and photographer Molly Hawkey. She is close friends with her Bates Motel co-star Freddie Highmore, who is godfather to her son, and with her Conjuring co-star Patrick Wilson.

Farmiga is a nondenominational Christian; in a 2011 interview with Christianity Today, Farmiga said: During the full-scale Russian invasion of Ukraine as part of the Russian-Ukrainian war, she expressed support for Ukraine and quoted the anthem of Ukraine.

Filmography and awards

According to the review-aggregate site Rotten Tomatoes and the box office site Box Office Mojo, Farmiga's highest-grossing and most critically acclaimed films include Down to the Bone (2004), The Manchurian Candidate (2004), The Departed (2006), Joshua (2007), The Boy in the Striped Pyjamas (2008), Orphan (2009), Up in the Air (2009), Source Code (2011), Safe House (2012), The Conjuring (2013), The Conjuring 2 (2016), The Commuter (2018), Godzilla: King of the Monsters (2019), and Annabelle Comes Home (2019).

Farmiga won a Los Angeles Film Critics Association Award for Best Actress and was nominated for an Independent Spirit Award for Best Female Lead for her role in Down to the Bone (2004). She won a British Independent Film Award for Best Actress for The Boy in the Striped Pyjamas (2008).

Her most acclaimed role, in Up in the Air (2009), garnered Farmiga nominations for an Academy Award for Best Supporting Actress, a Golden Globe Award for Best Supporting Actress, a BAFTA for Best Actress in a Supporting Role, and a Screen Actors Guild Award for Outstanding Female Actor in a Supporting Role. For her directorial debut, Higher Ground (2011), she received a Gotham Independent Film Award for Breakthrough Director nomination.

Farmiga won a Saturn Award for Best Actress on Television, and received nominations for a Primetime Emmy Award for Outstanding Lead Actress in a Drama Series and a TCA Award for Individual Achievement in Drama for her role in the drama series Bates Motel (20132017). For her performance in the miniseries When They See Us (2019), Farmiga received her second Primetime Emmy Award nomination, in the category of Outstanding Supporting Actress in a Limited Series or Movie.

References

External links

 
 
 

1973 births
20th-century American actresses
21st-century American actresses
Actresses from New Jersey
American expatriate actresses in Canada
American film actresses
American Pentecostals
American people of Ukrainian descent
American Shakespearean actresses
American stage actresses
American television actresses
Christians from New Jersey
Converts from Eastern Catholicism
Converts to Pentecostal denominations
Converts to evangelical Christianity from Roman Catholicism
Hunterdon Central Regional High School alumni
Living people
People from Clifton, New Jersey
People from Hunterdon County, New Jersey
People from Irvington, New Jersey
Sundance Film Festival award winners
Syracuse University alumni
Television producers from New York (state)
American women television producers
Television producers from New Jersey